The Roman Catholic Diocese of Baton Rouge (Latin Dioecesis Rubribaculensis; French Diocèse de Bâton-Rouge; Spanish: Diócesis de Baton Rouge) is a Latin Church ecclesiastical territory or diocese of the Catholic Church spanning Ascension, Assumption, East Baton Rouge, East Feliciana, Iberville, Livingston, Pointe Coupee, Tangipahoa, St. Helena, St. James, West Baton Rouge and West Feliciana (civil) parishes, a total area of about  in south central Louisiana.

The diocese as of 2014 consists of 64 diocesan parishes, 2 ethnic apostolates, and 2 university chaplaincies served by a total of 106 priests (50 active and 21 retired diocesan priests, 24 active and 6 retired religious priests, and 5 priests of other jurisdictions), 70 permanent deacons, 3 transitional deacons, 16 lay male religious (brothers), 90 female religious (nuns and sisters), and 17 seminarians.  It is a suffragan in the ecclesiastical province of the Metropolitan Archdiocese of New Orleans. The current bishop is Michael Duca.

History
The present-day Roman Catholic Diocese of Baton Rouge began with the work of French missionaries among the Native American peoples of the area. The first permanent church in the region was St. Francis Chapel of Pointe Coupée, built in 1738. Parishes were established at St. James in 1767, at St. Gabriel in 1769, at Donaldsonville in 1772, at Baton Rouge in 1792, and at Plattenville in 1793. The oldest church that still stands in its original form is the St. Gabriel Church in St. Gabriel, Louisiana.

On 25 April 1793, Pope Leo XIII erected the Diocese of Louisiana and the Two Floridas, subsequently renamed to the Diocese of New Orleans on 18 July 1826 and elevated to a metropolitan archdiocese on 19 July 1850.

Establishment and growth 
On 22 July 1961, Pope John XXIII promulgated the bull Peramplum novae aureliae erecting the Diocese of Baton Rouge, taking its territory from the Archdiocese of New Orleans and making it a suffragan of the same metropolitan archdiocese. The pope designated St. Joseph Church in the see city, built in 1853-1855 and renovated many times since, as the cathedral church of the new diocese. A census conducted in the very first year of the diocese's operation revealed its membership to be 164,476 Catholics out of the total of 464,904 people reported by the U. S. Census Bureau in the federal census conducted in prior year.

The first Bishop of Baton Rouge, Robert E. Tracy of New Orleans, Louisiana, organized the diocese in the spirit of Vatican II.

In 1974, Joseph V. Sullivan of Kansas City, Missouri, became Baton Rouge's second bishop.

In 1983, one of the original priests of the diocese, Bishop Stanley Joseph Ott, was named the third Bishop of Baton Rouge.

In November 1993, Auxiliary Bishop Alfred C. Hughes of the Roman Catholic Archdiocese of Boston, was installed as Baton Rouge's fourth bishop. In February 2001, Pope John Paul II appointed Bishop Hughes as Coadjutor Archbishop of New Orleans, where he subsequently succeeded the metropolitan archbishop in January 2002. Since their retirement in 2009, they served as a professor for Notre Dame Seminary in the city of New Orleans.

2018 sexual abuse scandal
In February 2018, a lawsuit for sexual abuse which was filed against the Roman Catholic Diocese of Baton Rouge and one of its priests, Father Jeff Bayhi, in 2009 by alleged abuse victim Rebecca Mayeux and her parents, due to the reliance on what another priest heard in confession as a major source of evidence. Bayhi was accused in the lawsuit of acknowledging that Rebecca Mayeux confessed to her that she was sexually abused by George Charlet Jr., another priest of the Roman Catholic Diocese of Baton Rouge, and that both Bayhi and the diocese refused to report the abuse to law enforcement. The Louisiana Supreme Court had previously ruled that the Catholic Seal of Confession is legally protected, with a diocese lawyer also noting that breaking the seal triggers automatic excommunication. However, the lawsuit against the estate of Charlet, who died in 2009, remained ongoing.

In January 2019, the Roman Catholic diocese released the names of 37 former clergy who had been accused of committing acts of sexual abuse while serving the diocese. The diocese added four more names to the list in February 2019, two more names in July 2019, two more names in January 2020, and another name in July 2020, bringing the current total to 46.

Bishops

Bishops of Baton Rouge
Robert Emmet Tracy (1961-1974)
Joseph Vincent Sullivan (1974-1982)
Stanley Joseph Ott (1983-1992)
Alfred Clifton Hughes (1993-2001), appointed Archbishop of New Orleans
Robert William Muench (2002-2018)
Michael Gerard Duca (2018–present)

Other priests of this diocese who became bishops
William Donald Borders, appointed Bishop of Orlando in 1968 and later Archbishop of Baltimore
Shelton Fabre, appointed Auxiliary Bishop of New Orleans in 2006 and later Bishop of Houma-Thibodaux. He is now the Archbishop of Louisville since March 30, 2022.

Schools

High schools:
 Ascension Catholic Diocesan High School (Donaldsonville)
 Catholic High School (Baton Rouge)
 Catholic High School of Pointe Coupee (New Roads)
 Saint Thomas Aquinas Diocesan Regional High School (Tangipahoa Parish)
 St. John the Evangelist Interparochial High School (Plaquemine)
 St. Joseph's Academy (Baton Rouge)
 St. Michael the Archangel Diocesan Regional High School (Shenandoah, East Baton Rouge Parish)

Ecclesiastical Province of New Orleans
See: Province of New Orleans

References

External links
Roman Catholic Diocese of Baton Rouge Official Site

 
Baton Rouge
Christian organizations established in 1961
Baton Rouge
Baton Rouge
1961 establishments in Louisiana